Malayalapuzha is a village outside the city suburbs of Pathanamthitta in Kerala. It is seven kilometers away from Pathanamthitta central junction and five kilometers from Kumbazha junction. Malayalapuzha is famous its ancient Bhadrakali temple. The place is also famous for its temple elephant Malayalapuzha Rajan, which is 9.5 feet high.

Other than State operated and private buses, jeep service is a popular mode of transportation at Malayalapuzha.

Demographics
 India census, Malayalapuzha had a population of 15468 with 7419 males and 8049 females.

Education
 MUSALIAR COLLEGE OF ARTS & SCIENCE, CHEENKALTHADOM, MALAYALAPPUZHA, PATHANAMTHITTA
 Musaliar College of Engineering & Technology, Malayalappuzha, Pathanamthitta

References

Villages in Pathanamthitta district

 Musaliar College of Arts and Science, Pathanamthitta